A sequin is a small, typically shiny, generally disk-shaped ornament.

Sequins are also referred to as paillettes, spangles, or diamanté (also spelled diamante). Although the words sequins, paillettes, lentejuelas, and spangles can be used interchangeably, diamanté (literally "set with diamonds")  is both an adjective and a plural-only noun, which specifically refers to diamond-shaped sequins and can also be used to mean "artificial diamonds", which serve the same purpose as sequins.

In costuming, sequins have a center hole, while spangles have the hole located at the top. Paillettes are typically very large and flat. Sequins may be stitched flat to the fabric, so they do not move, and are less likely to fall off; or they may be stitched at only one point, so they dangle and move easily,  catching more light. Some sequins are made with multiple facets, to increase their reflective ability, while others are stamped out with lobes resembling flower petals.

Etymology 
The ducat stopped being minted after the Napoleonic invasion of Italy, and the name sequin was falling out of use in its original sense. It was then that the name was taken up in France to designate what it means today, as 19th century sequins were made of shiny metal.

History

Historically across many parts of the world, attaching metal coins and baubles to clothes was done to display wealth or status or to keep the item closed securely.

Evidence exists that gold sequins were being used as decoration on clothing or paraphernalia in the Indus Valley as early as 2500 BC, during the Kot Diji phase. Solid gold sequins sewn into royal garments were found inside the tomb of Tutankhamun.

Sequins (mainly made out of reflective bits of metals) sewn into jackets, bonnets, and dresses were popular among the nobility and wealthy during the 17th to 19th centuries.

During the 1920s, after the discovery of the Tomb of Tutankhamun, sequins witnessed a renewed popularity as a consequence of Egyptomania. The usage of sequins (typically made out of metal) was widely popularized as a fashion statement by flapper girls during this period.

In the 1930s, lightweight electroplated gelatin sequins were produced which were significantly less heavy than their metal counterparts. However, the gelatin sequins would melt if they got wet or too warm. Algy Trimmings Co. (a apparel manufacturing company), working with Eastman Kodak, produced clear plastic sequins, although they suffered from brittleness. Polyester film was later used to surround the plastic sequin to safely wash it. Eventually, vinyl plastic generally replaced the film and plastic combination because of its durability and cost effectiveness.

In the late 1960s, sequins began to be widely used by popular musicians like The Supremes. Sequins continued to be popular into the 1970s and early 1980s.

See also
 Glitter
 Pearly Kings and Queens
 Oes

References

External links 
 
 

Beadwork
Fashion
Flappers